Visitor management refers to a set of practices or hardware additions that administrators can use to monitor the usage of a building or site. By gathering this information, a visitor management system can record the usage of facilities by specific visitors and provide documentation of visitor's whereabouts.

Proponents of an information-rich visitor management system point to increased security, particularly in schools, as one benefit. As more parents demand action from schools that will protect children from sexual predators, some school districts are turning to modern visitor management systems that not only track a visitor's stay, but also check the visitor's information against national and local criminal databases.

Visitor management technologies

Computer visitor management systems
Basic computer or electronic visitor management systems use a computer network to monitor and record visitor information and are commonly hosted on an iPad or a touchless kiosk.

An electronic visitor management system improves upon most of the negative points of a pen and paper system. Visitor ID can be checked against national and local databases, as well as in-house databases for potential security problems.

Visitor management software as a service

The legacy on-site visitor management software is considered to be expensive and requires maintenance, having obstacles of the overlap of operations, facility management and IT, and difficulties in introducing a unified system to multiple company locations with different processes and requirements.

SaaS visitor management software for schools allows administrators to screen visitors upon entrance, often checking for sex offender status, and restricting access to unauthorized entrants. 

SaaS visitor management software for the real estate industry allows landlords and managers to remotely control and monitor access rights without the need to pass physical keys and keycards to new tenants. 

SaaS visitor management software for commercial offices allows facilities managers to automate their building's reception area with advocates of this type of system claiming a variety of benefits, including both security and privacy. Many modern SaaS visitor management systems are tablet-based apps, and are thin client solutions operating software as a service in the cloud.

Visitor management systems on smartphones 
Smart phone based visitor management system work similarly to a web-based system, but hosts can get real-time notifications or alerts on their device. Hosts can allow or deny visits to guests based on their interests or availability.

Smartphone-based visitor management systems also enable features like automatic and touchless sign-in using technologies that include QR codes and geofencing.

Integrations with other systems 
Cloud-based visitor management systems offer integration with other workplace management systems, such as communication apps, access control, data report, and Wi-Fi credentials. An integrated visitor management system organises, streamlines, and collects important data that facilities managers can use to understand their workplaces while offering a great experience for employees and visitors. 

Featuring an open API enables modern visitor management systems to integrate with any software and workflows without limitation.

Types of Visitor Management Systems
 Pen and paper-based system

 On-premise software

 Cloud-based software

Use Cases
 Hospitals 

 Schools

 Commercial buildings

 Offices

 Convention Centers/ Manufactories for contractor management

See also
 Access control
 Optical turnstile
 Identity document
 Proximity card
 Boom barrier
Cross-device tracking

References

External links

Access control
Security